Acanthurus pyroferus is a species of fish in the family Acanthuridae, the unicornfishes and tangs. Its common names include chocolate surgeonfish, mimic surgeonfish, orange-gilled surgeonfish, Pacific mimic surgeon, and yellowspot surgeon.

This fish can be found in the Indo-Pacific, excluding Hawaii. It lives primarily around steep, shallow slopes near the coast with clear sand and corals. It reaches 25 centimeters in length.

This fish is occasionally kept in aquaria.

References

External links
 
 

Acanthurus
Fish described in 1834
Taxa named by Heinrich von Kittlitz